Korino is a rural locality (a village) in Vorobyovskoye Rural Settlement, Sokolsky District, Vologda Oblast, Russia. The population was 28 as of 2002.

Geography 
Korino is located 62 km northeast of Sokol (the district's administrative centre) by road. Novoye is the nearest rural locality.

References 

Rural localities in Sokolsky District, Vologda Oblast